The Wiltshire Football League, also known as the Wiltshire League and the Wiltshire Senior League, is a football league in England which was formed by amalgamation in 1976. All clubs are affiliated to a County Football Association. The area covered by the competition is the county of Wiltshire and 15 miles beyond the county boundary. The league is at Level 11 of England's National League System pyramid, and operates a Premier Division, Division 1, an U18 Youth Floodlight Division and two Veterans (over 35's) divisions.

The league is sponsored by Corsham Print.

History 
The league was established in 1976 by the Wiltshire Football Association as a replacement for the Wiltshire Combination League and the amateur Wiltshire League.

Sponsorship by Corsham Print begin in 2015–16. Starting in 2016–17, the Swindon & District League and the Trowbridge & District League became formal feeder leagues, with one club from each potentially promoted to the Wiltshire Senior League each season, and relegation in the other direction.

Wiltshire Senior Football League Limited, a private company limited by guarantee, was established in 2021.

Member clubs (2022–23)
For the 2022–23 season, the league's Premier Division was reduced to 16 clubs and Division 1 was created.

The composition of the Premier Division for 2022–23 is as follows. Where a club is outside Wiltshire, their city or county is shown in brackets.	
 Blunsdon 
 Calne Town Reserves
 Devizes Town 
 Frome Collegians (Somerset)
 Kintbury Rangers (Berkshire) 
 Malmesbury Victoria Development
 Marlborough Town
 Melksham Town Reserves
 Odd Down Development (Bath)
 Pewsey Vale	
 Royal Wootton Bassett Town Development
 Salisbury Development
 Shrewton United	
 Stratton Juniors
 Trowbridge Town
 Wroughton
Seven clubs compete in Division 1.

History
The formation of the Wiltshire County Football League resulted from the amalgamation of the Wiltshire Combination and Wiltshire Leagues. The following Officers and Committee were elected at the inaugural meeting held in Devizes: J R Nunn (Chairman), W L Miles (Vice-chairman), E S M Ashman (Secretary), F E Jones (Assistant Secretary), C G Scott (Treasurer), P J Ackrill (Registration Secretary), and K J Mulraney (Referees' Appointments Secretary). There was a Management Committee of fourteen Vice-presidents.

The league was initially to consist of no more than 56 clubs.

1976 league constitution 
Senior Division 1 – Amesbury, Malmesbury Victoria, Avon (Bradford), Park YC, Bemerton Athletic, Salisbury City Res, Bromham, Sanford, Calne Town, St Joseph's YC, Chippenham Town Res, Vickers (South Marston), Ferndale Athletic, Westbury Utd, Highworth Town, Wootton Bassett Town
Senior Division 2 – Avebury, Pewsey Vale, Burbage Sports, Purton, Corsham Town, Rowde, Lawn (Swindon), Warminster Town, Ludgershall, West Lavington, Marlborough Town, Wroughton
Junior Division (Section A) – Box Rovers, Sarsen Utd, Corsham Town Res, Sherston, Croft, Shrewton, Frogwell, Sutton and Seagry, Highworth Town Res, Trowbridge Youth, Laverstock and Ford, Walcot Boys Athletic, Park YC Res, West Lavington Res, Penhill YC, West Swindon
Junior Division (Section B) – Amesbury Res, Malmesbury Victoria Res, Avon (Bradford) Res, Marlborough Town Res, Bemerton Athletic Res, Pewsey Vale Res, Bromham Res, Purton Res, Calne Town Res, Sanford Res, Devizes Town Res, St Joseph's YC Res, Ferndale Athletic Res, Vickers (South Marston) Res, Lawn (Swindon) Res, Wootton Bassett Town Res

1990–91 season 
The Cup Competitions had new sponsors and were renamed the Addkey Senior KO Cup and the Fountain Trophies Junior KO Cup.

1991–92 season
The league extended its boundaries this season and changed its name to The Wiltshire Football League. This season saw the league enter into a Pyramid of Football Agreement with the Western and Hellenic Football Leagues.

1994–95 season
A new logo was introduced, changing the design for the first time since the league was formed.

1998–99 season
With the introduction of new Senior status standards by the Wiltshire County Football Association, an Intermediate status was introduced and the league amended its rules accordingly.  Division 1 became the Premier Division, Division 2 the Intermediate Division, Division 3 became Junior Division 1 and Division 4 became Junior Division 2.  The Intermediate Division was sponsored by Plaister Auto Services.

2003–04 season
There were an insufficient number of clubs at Intermediate status this season, so the league reverted to two junior divisions.  The league had new sponsors this season in Plaister Auto Services and changed their name accordingly.

2014–15 season
There were an insufficient number of clubs at Intermediate status this season, so the league closed the Junior Division.

List of champions

References

External links
 
 FA Full-time page

 
Sports leagues established in 1976
1976 establishments in England